Zornia cearensis is a poisonous plant.

References

cearensis